Motion interpolation or motion-compensated frame interpolation (MCFI) is a form of video processing in which intermediate animation frames are generated between existing ones by means of interpolation, in an attempt to make animation more fluid, to compensate for display motion blur, and for fake slow motion effects.

Hardware applications

Displays
Motion interpolation is a common, optional feature of various modern display devices such as HDTVs and video players, aimed at increasing perceived framerate or alleviating display motion blur, a common problem on LCD flat-panel displays.

Difference from display framerate
A display's framerate is not always equivalent to that of the content being displayed. In other words, a display capable of or operating at a high framerate does not necessarily mean that it can or must perform motion interpolation. For example, a TV running at 120 Hz and displaying 24 FPS content will simply display each content frame for five of the 120 display frames per second. This has no effect on the picture other than eliminating the need for 3:2 pulldown and thus film judder as a matter of course (since 120 is evenly divisible by 24). Eliminating judder results in motion that is less "jumpy" and which matches that of a theater projector. Motion interpolation can be used to reduce judder, but it is not required in order to do so.

Relationship to advertised display framerate
The advertised frame-rate of a specific display may refer to either the maximum number of content frames which may be displayed per second, or the number of times the display is refreshed in some way, irrespective of content. In the latter case, the actual presence or strength of any motion interpolation option may vary. In addition, the ability of a display to show content at a specific framerate does not mean that display is capable of accepting content running at that rate; most consumer displays above 60 Hz do not accept a higher frequency signal, but rather use the extra frame capability to eliminate judder, reduce ghosting, or create interpolated frames.

As an example, a TV may be advertised as "240 Hz", which would mean one of two things:

 The TV can natively display 240 frames per second, and perform advanced motion interpolation which inserts between 2 and 8 new frames between existing ones (for content running at 60 FPS to 24 FPS, respectively). For active 3D, this framerate would be halved.
 The TV is natively only capable of displaying 120 frames per second, and basic motion interpolation which inserts between 1 and 4 new frames between existing ones. Typically the only difference from a "120 Hz" TV in this case is the addition of a strobing backlight, which flickers on and off at 240 Hz, once after every 120 Hz frame. The intent of a strobing backlight is to increase the apparent response rate and thus reduce ghosting, which results in smoother motion overall. However, this technique has nothing to do with actual framerate. For active 3D, this framerate is halved, and no motion interpolation or pulldown functionality is typically provided. 600 Hz is an oft-advertised figure for plasma TVs, and while technically correct, it only refers to an inter-frame response time of 1.6 milliseconds. This can significantly reduce ghosting and thus improve motion quality, but is unrelated to interpolation and content framerate. There are no consumer films shot at 600 frames per second, nor any TV processors capable of generating 576 interpolated frames per second.

Software applications

Video playback software
Motion interpolation features are included with several video player applications.

 WinDVD uses Philips' TrimensionDNM for frame interpolation.
 PowerDVD uses TrueTheater Motion for interpolation of DVD and video files to up to 72 frame/s.
 Splash PRO uses Mirillis Motion² technology for up to Full HD video interpolation.
 DmitriRender uses GPU-oriented frame rate conversion algorithm with native DXVA support for frame interpolation.
 Bluesky Frame Rate Converter is a DirectShow filter that can convert the frame rate using AMD Fluid Motion.
 SVP (SmoothVideo Project) comes integrated by default with MPC-HC; paid version can integrate with more players, including VLC.

Video editing software
Some video editing software and plugins offer motion interpolation effects to enhance digitally-slowed video. FFmpeg is a free software non-interactive tool with such functionality. Adobe After Effects has this in a feature called "Pixel Motion". The effects plugin "Twixtor" is available for most major video editing suites, and offers similar functionality.

Virtual reality 
On October 6, 2016, Oculus VR announced that it would enable the use of motion interpolation on the Oculus Rift virtual reality headset, via the implementation of features such as Asynchronous SpaceWarp and Asynchronous TimeWarp. This allowed the device to be used on computers whose specifications are not high enough to render to the headset at 90 frames per second.

Neural networks 
 Depth-Aware Video Frame Interpolation
 Channel Attention Is All You Need
 Real-Time Intermediate Flow Estimation
 Intermediate Feature Refine Network
 Deep learning super sampling used specifically to interpolate frames in real-time for video games

Side effects

Visual artifacts

Motion interpolation on certain brands of TVs is sometimes accompanied by visual anomalies in the picture, described by CNET's David Carnoy as a "little tear or glitch" in the picture, appearing for a fraction of a second. He adds that the effect is most noticeable when the technology suddenly kicks in during a fast camera pan. Television and display manufacturers refer to this phenomenon as a type of digital artifact. Due to the improvement of associated technology over time, such artifacts appear less frequently with modern consumer TVs, though they have yet to be eliminated entirely "the artifacts happens more often when the gap between frames are bigger".

Soap opera effect 
As a byproduct of the perceived increase in frame rate, motion interpolation may introduce a "video" (versus "film") look. This look is commonly referred to as the "soap opera effect" (SOE), in reference to the distinctive appearance of most broadcast television soap operas or pre 2000s multicam sitcoms, which were typically shot using less expensive 60i video rather than film.
Many complain that the soap opera effect ruins the theatrical look of cinematic works, by making it appear as if the viewer is either on set or watching a behind the scenes featurette. Almost all manufacturers provide ways to disable the feature, but because methods and terminology differ, the UHD Alliance proposed that all televisions have a "Filmmaker Mode" button on remote controls to disable motion smoothing.

Sports viewers appreciate motion interpolation, as it reduces motion blur produced by camera pans and shaky cameras, and thus yields better clarity of such images. It may also be used to increase the apparent framerate of video games for a more realistic feel, although the addition of display lag may be an undesired side effect. This "video look" is created deliberately by the VidFIRE technique to restore archive television programs that only survive as film telerecordings. The main differences between an artificially (interpolated) and naturally (in-camera) high framerate are that in-camera is not subject to any of the aforementioned artifacts, contains more accurate (or "true to life") image data, and requires more storage space and bandwidth, since frames are not produced in real time.

See also
 Inbetweening
 Motion compensation
 Motion interpolation (computer graphics)
 Flicker-free
 Television standards conversion
3:2 pulldown

References

External links
 High Frame Rate Motion Compensated Frame Interpolation in High-Definition Video Processing
 A Low Complexity Motion Compensated Frame Interpolation Method

Display technology
Video processing
Interpolation
Video
Film and video technology